Atrial septal defect 1 is a protein that in humans is encoded by the ASD1 gene.

References